David Levy may refer to:

 David A. Levy (born 1953), American politician
 David Benjamin Levy (fl. 2000s), American musicologist
 David H. Levy (born 1948), Canadian astronomer and science writer
 David Levy Yulee (1810–1886), American politician and attorney
 David L. Levy (born 1936), children's rights activist
 David Levy (chess player) (born 1945), British chess player
 David Levy (historian) (born 1937), American historian
 David Levy (inventor) (born c. 1962), American inventor
 David Levy (Israeli politician) (born 1937), Israeli politician
 David Levy (psychologist) (born 1954), American psychologist, author, actor
 David Levy (footballer) (born 1963), Israeli footballer
 David Levy (economist), American economist and author
 David Guy Levy, president and CEO of Periscope Entertainment
 David Levy, former CEO of the Brooklyn Nets and former president of the Turner Broadcasting System
 David M. Levy, American computer scientist
 David C. Levy (born 1938), museum director

See also
 Dave Levey, a winner of the American version of Hell's Kitchen
 David Levi (disambiguation)